Rolicyclidine (PCPy) is a dissociative anesthetic  that is similar in effects to phencyclidine, but is slightly less potent and has fewer stimulant effects. It instead produces a sedative effect described as being somewhat similar to a barbiturate, but with additional PCP-like dissociative, anaesthetic and hallucinogenic effects. Due to its similarity in effects to PCP, PCPy was placed into the Schedule I list of illegal drugs in the 1970s, although it has never been widely abused and is now little known.

See also
 PCP
 Arylcyclohexylamine
 Picilorex
 α-PHP

References

Arylcyclohexylamines
Dissociative drugs
Pyrrolidines
Designer drugs
NMDA receptor antagonists